The 2012–13 All-Ireland Senior Club Football Championship was the 43rd staging of the All-Ireland Senior Club Football Championship since its establishment by the Gaelic Athletic Association in 1970-71. The championship began on 21 October 2012 and ended on 17 March 2013.

Crossmaglen Rangers entered the championship as the defending champions, however, they were beaten by St. Brigid's in the All-Ireland semi-final.

On 17 March 2013, St. Brigid's won the championship following a 2-11 to 2-10 defeat of Basllymun Kickhams in the All-Ireland final at Croke Park. It remains their only championship title.

Ballymun Kickhams's Dean Rock was the championship's top scorer with 1-26.

Results

Connacht Senior Club Football Championship

Quarter-final

Semi-finals

Final

Leinster Senior Club Football Championship

First round

Quarter-finals

Semi-finals

Final

Munster Senior Club Football Championship

Quarter-finals

Semi-finals

Final

Ulster Senior Club Football Championship

Preliminary round

Quarter-finals

Semi-finals

Final

All-Ireland Senior Club Football Championship

Quarter-final

Semi-finals

Final

Championship statistics

Top scorers

Overall

In a single game

References

All-Ireland Senior Club Football Championship
All-Ireland Senior Club Football Championship
All-Ireland Senior Club Football Championship